"Boogie On Reggae Woman" is a 1974 funk song by American Motown artist Stevie Wonder, released as the second single from his seventeenth studio album, Fulfillingness' First Finale, issued that same year. Despite the song's title, its style is firmly funk/R&B and neither boogie nor reggae. It continued Wonder's successful Top Ten streak on the pop charts, reaching number three and also spent two weeks at number one on the soul charts. Billboard ranked it as the No. 26 song for 1975. At the 17th Grammy Awards, Stevie Wonder won the Best R&B Vocal Performance, Male for this song.

It features Wonder's distinctive harmonica, although not his usual chromatic type, but instead a diatonic A-flat "blues harp". The song is also notable for Wonder's pulsating Moog synthesizer bassline. The lyrics are designed as a dialogue between "nice" and "naughty" intent, including the introduction to his harmonica break, which incorporates Wonder's casual but repeated question "Can I play?"

Following conclusion of the vocal, the harmonica is reprised for the remaining seventy seconds, and concluding thirty bars of the tune, to the fade.

Critical reception
Writing for AllMusic, Ed Hogan said, "'Boogie on Reggae Woman' was light and bouncy, strutting along on a funky, percolating pulse. Johnny Nash's 1972 number one pop gold single 'I Can See Clearly Now' had primed the mainstream audience for the reggae sound that Wonder employed on the cut."  Billboard said the song has an "irresistible beat," "infectious melody" and "Caribbean flavor."  Cash Box said that "a taste of reggae flavoring spices this ditty with Stevie's inimitable vocal style" and "the Wonder man comes across with just the right funk and instrumentation." Record World said that "Stevie brings his 'Fingertips' facile harmonica style back in the spotlight."

Personnel
 Stevie Wonder – lead vocal, Fender Rhodes, piano, harmonica, drums, Moog bass
 Rocky Dzidzornu – congas

Charts

See also
List of number-one R&B singles of 1974 (U.S.)

References

Songs about reggae
1974 singles
Stevie Wonder songs
Cashbox number-one singles
Songs written by Stevie Wonder
Tamla Records singles
1974 songs
Funk songs
Song recordings produced by Stevie Wonder